An aerial image is a projected image which is "floating in air", and cannot be viewed normally. It can only be seen from one position in space, often focused by another lens. 

Aerial image technology was used in optical printers and movie special effects photography before the advent of computer graphics in movie production, and also for combining animation and live action footage onto one piece of film.

Film and video technology